Patrick Donoghue was an English footballer who played for Celtic, Millwall Athletic, and Port Vale.

Career
Donoghue played for Celtic and Millwall Athletic, before joining Port Vale in August 1922. After three Second Division matches he lost his place in the first team and was released from The Old Recreation Ground at the end of the 1922–23.

Career statistics
Source:

References

Year of birth missing
Year of death missing
English footballers
Association football wingers
Celtic F.C. players
Millwall F.C. players
Port Vale F.C. players
Scottish Football League players
English Football League players